Colette Baron-Reid (born July 17, 1958) is a spiritual intuitive, intuitive counselor, oracle expert, intuition expert, spiritual medium, author, radio and TV personality<ref>The Times of Our Lives: Extraordinary True Stories of Synchronicity, Destiny, Meaning, and Purpose, by Louise L. Hay, Jill Kramer, Published by Hay House, Inc., 2006. , page 10.</ref> and podcast host.

 Early life 
Baron-Reid was born to European immigrant parents and raised with one sister in Toronto, Ontario, Canada. She attended Havergal College for women from kindergarten to grade 12, then attended Carleton University in Ottawa, Ontario. During her 20s, she decided to pursue her career as a singer in Toronto. At the age of 28, she professionally began performing intuitive readings.

 Career 
At the age of 41, Colette was signed to EMI Records Canada. She released two CDs with EMI Records: Magdalene's Garden (produced by Eric Rosse), and I Am/Grace. In 2006, her contract was terminated, after which she decided to pursue a career as an author and public speaker.

She has published 4 books with Hay House Publishing which include: Remembering the Future: The Path to Recovering Intuition (2007), Messages From Spirit: The Extraordinary Power of Oracles, Omens, and Signs (2008), The Map: Finding the Magic and Meaning in the Story of Your Life (2011), Uncharted: The Journey through Uncertainty to Infinite Possibility (2018)

Besides publishing books, she also released 10 Oracle Card Decks: The Shaman's Dream Oracle (2021) which she co-authored with Alberto Villoldo, Oracle of the 7 Energies (2020), Crystal Spirits Oracle (2019), Goddess Power Oracle (2018), Spirit Animal Oracle (2018)
The Mystical Shaman Oracle (2018) which she co-authored with Alberto Villoldo and Marcela Lobos, The Good Tarot (2017), Postcards from Spirit: A 52-Card Oracle Deck (2017), The Wisdom of the Oracle (2015), The Enchanted Map (2011), The Wisdom of the Hidden Realms (2009), The Wisdom of Avalon (2007).

In 2022, Colette launched her first podcast INSIDE THE WOONIVERSE.

She is also the founder of Oracle School an online personal development course that uses oracle cards as tools for personal growth.

 Live Events 

From 2006 to 2011, Colette spoke as an Intuitive Counsellor at I Can Do It! Hay House Conferences where she also provided live readings for audience members. During 2007-2009, she was featured as the opening lecturer at Sylvia Brownes multi-city US tour presented by Hay House Publishers.

In 2015, Colette did a 12 city Canadian tour doing live audience readings from the stage, including the cities: Edmonton AB, Calgary AB, Regina SK, Saskatoon SK, Winnipeg MB, Thunder Bay ON, Sault Ste. Marie ON, Sudbury ON, Hamilton ON, Windsor ON, London ON, Ottawa ON.

In 2017, Colette held her first solo event OraclePalooza. She has since hosted the yearly event in various cities in the United States and has since made the event virtual during the ongoing COVID-19 pandemic. 

In 2021, Colette held a virtual mediumship event called Mystical Connections with psychic/medium John Holland.  

In 2022, Colette and angel expert Kyle Gray teamed up for a virtual mediumship/intuitive event called Angles & Oracles.  

In 2022, Colette and spiritual teacher Denise Linn, hosted a virtual past life regression & future life progression event.   

Colette also hosts live virtual Winter and Summer Solstice Celebrations where her and a guest astrologer perform a solstice ritual and discuss the astrological influences during that time. Guest astrologers have included Leslie Tagorda,Jennifer Racioppi, and Colin Bedell   

 Messages From Spirit TV Show and other Appearances 

In 2014, Colette starred as herself in her Canadian TV show "Messages From Spirit". The show was 26 episode long and consisted of live audience mediumship readings with added commentary from the audience member who received the reading.

On July 30, 2012, Colette appeared for the first time on Dr. Phil talk show in the episode called Inside The Other Side alongside a panel of experts which included psychic and cosmic coach Dougall Fraser, spiritual medium Rebecca Rosen, and numerologist Glynis McCants.

On December 10, 2012, she made her second appearance on the show on a panel with psychic/medium John Edward and numerologist Glynis McCants.

 Radio & Podcast Shows 

In 2006, she started hosting The Colette Baron-Reid Show on Hay House Radio which aired every Thursday and ended in 2019. She also co-hosted the Buddha Lounge with Natasha Dern on CFRB 1010 AM Talk Radio in Toronto Canada aired every Sunday.

In 2011, she started hosting two radio shows on NewSkyRadio.com; The Colette Baron-Reid Show and the Intuitive Coach Radio.

In 2022, she launched her first podcast, INSIDE THE WOONIVERSE. A weekly podcast series featuring authentic and playful conversations with other sages, scientists and celebrities such as Dr. David Hamilton, Colin Bedell, Abiola Abrams, Gabrielle Bernstein.

 Bibliography Remembering The Future: The Path To Recovering Intuition (Sept 1, 2006) Hay House PublishingThe Wisdom of Avalon Oracle Cards: A 52-Card Deck and Guidebook (Sept 1, 2007) Hay House PublishingMessages From Spirit: The Extraordinary Power Of Oracles, Omens, and Signs (May 1, 2008)Hay House Publishing The Wisdom of The Hidden Realms: A 44-Card Deck and Guidebook (Oct 1, 2009) Hay House PublishingThe Map: Finding The Magic and Meaning In the Story Of Your Life (Jan 15, 2011) Hay House PublishingThe Enchanted Map Oracle Cards: A 44-Card Deck and Guidebook (Nov 1, 2011) Hay House PublishingWisdom of the House of Night Oracle Cards: A 50-Card Deck and Guidebook by P.C. Cast and Colette Baron-Reid (Oct 2, 2012)Weight Loss for People Who Feel Too Much: A 4-Step, 8-Week Plan to Finally Lose the Weight, Manage Your Emotions, and Find Your Fabulous Self (Jan 1, 2013) Harmony BooksUncharted: The Journey through Uncertainty to Infinite Possibility (Jan 16, 2018) Hay House PublishingThe Wisdom of the Oracle Divination Cards: Ask and Know (Sep 29, 2015) Hay House PublishingThe Good Tarot: A 78-Card Deck and Guidebook (Apr 11, 2017) Hay House PublishingPostcards from Spirit: A 52-Card Oracle Deck (Oct 10, 2017) Hay House PublishingMystical Shaman Oracle Cards: A 64-Card Oracle Deck and Guidebook by Colette Baron-Reid, Alberto Villoldo, Ph.D and Marcela Lobos (March 27, 2018) Hay House PublishingThe Spirit Animal Oracle: A 64-Card Oracle Deck and Guidebook (October 2, 2018) Hay House PublishingThe Goddess Power Oracle: A 52-Card Oracle Deck and Guidebook (February 19, 2019) Hay House PublishingThe Crystal Spirits Oracle: A 58-Card Oracle Deck and Guidebook (August 6, 2019) Hay House PublishingOracle of the 7 Energies Oracle: A 49-Card Oracle Deck and Guidebook (August 4, 2020) Hay House PublishingOracle of the 7 Energies Journal: A Journal that dives deeper into energy and themes of the companion oracle deck (October 27, 2020) Hay House PublishingThe Shaman's Dream Oracle: A 64-Card Oracle Deck and Guidebook by Colette Baron-Reid and Alberto Villoldo (March 23, 2021) Hay House PublishingThe Oracle Card Journal: A Daily Practice for Igniting Your Insight, Intuition, and Magic: A Journal to write, reflect, and create as you discover the power of oracle cards for personal growth and for reclaiming your magical connection to the universe. (October 25, 2022) Hay House Inc.

 Discography Magdalene's Garden (2001) EMI Music CanadaI Am/Grace (2005) EMI Music CanadaJourney Through The Chakras (2007) Hay House PublishingMessages from Spirit 4-CD: Exploring Your Connection to Divine Guidance (2008) Hay House PublishingWeight Loss for People Who Feel Too Much: A 4-Step, 8-Week Plan to Finally Lose the Weight, Manage Your Emotions, and Find Your Fabulous Self'' (Jan 1, 2013) Harmony Books

References

External links
 

1958 births
Canadian motivational speakers
Canadian psychics
Canadian radio personalities
Canadian self-help writers
Spiritual mediums
Canadian spiritual writers
Living people
Musicians from Toronto
Writers from Toronto
21st-century Canadian women singers